Bogusław Owczarek (born 11 July 1965) is a Polish equestrian. He competed in the team eventing at the 1996 Summer Olympics.

References

External links
 

1965 births
Living people
Polish male equestrians
Olympic equestrians of Poland
Equestrians at the 1996 Summer Olympics
People from Piotrków County